De Leest was a fine dining restaurant located in Vaassen in the Netherlands.

The restaurant was awarded one Michelin star in the period 2003–2006, two Michelin stars in the period 2007–2013, and three Michelin stars since 2014 until it was closed on 27 December 2019.

On 7 October 2019 the restaurant announced that it will close down "later this year". The restaurant was closed on 27 December 2019.

De Leest was a member of Les Patrons Cuisiniers.

See also
List of Michelin starred restaurants in the Netherlands

Sources and references

External links 
  

Michelin Guide starred restaurants in the Netherlands
Restaurants in the Netherlands
De Leest
De Leest
Fine dining